Government Degree Science, Arts & Commerce College Memon Goth is a Co-education degree college located in Memon Goth Karachi, Pakistan adjacent to the Office of Union Council Murad Memon Goth.

History 
Government Degree Science, Arts & Commerce College Memon Goth was the first educational institution to provide the education on Higher Secondary basis in Gadap Town. It was established in 1983-84 with 105 students at that time. It is located on a huge area along with the Office of the Chairman Union Council Memon Goth. The area of the college includes the agricultural lands of Malir & Memon Goth itself.

Library
The college library has a collection of over 18,500 reference books, encyclopedias, dictionaries, manuals, atlases, and other materials. It is available for use by the local population as well as students.

References 

Universities and colleges in Karachi